Miguel Herrero y Rodríguez de Miñón (born 18 June 1940) is a Spanish jurist and politician. A member of the Union of the Democratic Centre until 1982, then of People's Alliance and its successor, the People's Party, he is one of the "Fathers of the Constitution", the seven legislators who participating in the draft of the Spanish constitutional text passed in 1978.

Ideology 
Self-described as an "españolista de la España Grande" (roughly "spanishist of the Great Spain"), Herrero de Miñón has been placed as representative of a fringe strand of nationalism advocate of neoforalism within the Spanish conservative spectrum.

University education: legal and philosophical 
Son of high school professor and hispanist Miguel Herrero García, he studied law in Madrid, where, as he says in his Memoirs of Summer, he was "more studious than a student". After graduating in 1961, he earned his doctorate in 1965 with a thesis on the Constitutional Law that emerged after decolonization. He completed his training at Oxford, in Paris and in Louvain, where he graduated in Philosophy in 1968. A lawyer with the Council of State since 1966, he soon began to collaborate with the press -Diario Ya, Diario Madrid, Informaciones-, spreading his ideas about what the transition to the death of Francisco Franco should be.

In 1975, he married Cristina Jáuregui Segurola, daughter of Ramón Jáuregui Epalza and M.ª Luisa Segurola Guereca.

Political Activity 
Rodríguez de Miñón was Technical Secretary General of the Ministry of Justice, collaborating very actively in the first amnesty (1976), in the Law for Political Reform and in the first electoral regulations of the newborn democracy. He participated in the drafting of the 1978 Constitution and held the position of spokesman in the Congress of Deputies, both for the governing party (UCD) and the opposition (AP). He was a deputy for the UCD from 1977 to 1981. Some authors have identified him as one of the architects of the "harassment and demolition operation" against Adolfo Suárez, which reportedly ended with his being crowned head of the UCD parliamentary group. Herrero de Miñón also reportedly maintained contacts with political leaders of the opposition with the aim of removing Suárez from power.

He left UCD in February 1982 and joined Alianza Popular in July of that year. He was also elected as an AP and PP deputy in the 1982, 1986 and 1989 elections.

In 1979, he was elected councillor of the Madrid City Council in the April municipal elections. In 1987, he ran for President of Alianza Popular, but was defeated by Antonio Hernández Mancha.

Decorations and awards 

 Great Cross of the Order of Isabella the Catholic (1978)
 "Friend of the Basques" Award (1998)
 Creu de Sant Jordi (2000)
 Collar of the Order of Civil Merit (2003)
Doctor honorary /hon./ Universidad de Buenos Aires (UBA) (2017)
Doctor honorary /hon./ Universidad Pontificia Comillas (2018)

References 
Informational notes

Citations

Bibliography 
 
 

1940 births
People's Party (Spain) politicians
Living people
Madrid city councillors (1979–1983)
Spanish nationalists